Douglas Mackenzie (died 9 January 1890) was an Anglican bishop in the second half of the 19th century.

He was educated at St Albans School and Peterhouse, Cambridge. A noted mathematician, he served simultaneously as principal of St. Andrew's School, Bloemfontein, archdeacon of Harrismith and a canon of Bloemfontein Cathedral before his appointment as the second bishop of Zululand. He remained bishop of Zululand until his death from fever in January 1890. After his death a memorial to him was erected at St Peter's, Raunds.

References

Year of birth unknown
1890 deaths
19th-century Anglican Church of Southern Africa bishops
Alumni of Peterhouse, Cambridge
Anglican archdeacons in Africa
Anglican bishops of Zululand
People educated at St Albans School, Hertfordshire